The  is a multi-purpose stadium in Matsuyama Central Park, Matsuyama, Ehime, Shikoku, Japan.  It is currently used mostly for baseball matches.  The stadium holds 30,136 people.

The nickname is "Botchan Stadium".  It is named after well-known novel Botchan written by Natsume Sōseki who once lived in Matsuyama.

The stadium is the home ground of the Ehime Mandarin Pirates playing in Shikoku Island League.

References

External links 
Stadium information 

Baseball venues in Japan
Multi-purpose stadiums in Japan
Buildings and structures in Ehime Prefecture
Tourist attractions in Ehime Prefecture